Talacker is a quarter in the district 2 of Winterthur.

It was formerly a part of Oberwinterthur municipality, which was incorporated into Winterthur in 1922.

Talacker is also a bar in the city of Zürich (located at the Talacker-Strasse).

Winterthur